SS John P. Poe was a Liberty ship built in the United States during World War II. She was named after John P. Poe, the Attorney General of Maryland, from 1891 to 1895. Poe was the nephew of the poet Edgar Allan Poe. Poe was a lawyer as well as a leading member of the Maryland Democratic Party, and served as Dean of the University of Maryland School of Law.

Construction
John P. Poe was laid down on 24 May 1942, under a Maritime Commission (MARCOM) contract, MCE hull 54, by the Bethlehem-Fairfield Shipyard, Baltimore, Maryland; she was sponsored by Mrs. Charles J. Bekay, the niece of Vice Admiral Emory S. Land, the Chairman of MARCOM, and was launched on 24 July 1942.

History
She was allocated to A.H. Bull & Co., Inc., on 31 July 1942. On 30 November 1949, she was laid up in the National Defense Reserve Fleet, Mobile, Alabama. She was sold for scrapping on 28 October 1971, to Union Minerals & Alloys Corp. She was withdrawn from the fleet on 21 December 1971.

References

Bibliography

 
 
 
 

 

Liberty ships
Ships built in Baltimore
1942 ships
Mobile Reserve Fleet